Tony Tammaro, stage name of Vincenzo Sarnelli (born January 7, 1961 in Naples), is an Italian parody singer/songwriter. The main theme of Tammaro's lyrics are "tamarri", a term taken from Neapolitan dialect, which indicates someone who is vulgar, miseducated, and often boasting a flourishing behaviour. The term could also be translated as "rednecks", to indicate its derogatory nature; however, it presents no connections with the original term in regards of its rural background. In his songs, Tammaro uses irony to describe the "tamarri", from which his own stage name is derived.

Career 
Tammaro started his career in 1989, releasing Prima cassetta di musica tamarra.

In 1993 Tony Tammaro was the winner of the 4th edition of Festival di Sanscemo with the song "E v'a facite appere".

In 1997 Tammaro returned to the studio to record the album Monnezzarium and released "'O trerrote" as the first single. Tammaro released his greatest hits album Tutto Tony Tammaro in 1999. It is a double album and each of two CDs is made up of twentyfour songs.

Tony Tammaro and his band released The Dark Side of the Moonnezz in June 2005. "Moonnezz" is a phonetic pun since it sounds like "munnezz", the Neapolitan word for garbage.

Discography

Studio albums
1989: Prima Cassetta di Musica Tamarra
1991: Nun Chiagnere Marì
1992: Da Granto Farò il Cantanto
1993: Se Potrei Avere Te
1997: Monnezzarium
2005: The Dark Side of the Moonnezz
2010: Yes I Cant
2015: Tokyo Londra Scalea

Compilation albums
1999: Tutto Tony Tammaro

References

External links

 Tony Tammaro official website
 Tony Tammaro on Myspace

1961 births
Living people
Musicians from Naples
Parody musicians
Italian parodists
Italian singer-songwriters
Italian comedy musicians
Italian pop singers